Callistopteris bauerianum, known as the large filmy fern and Bauer's bristle fern, is a fern in the family Hymenophyllaceae. The specific epithet honours the Austrian botanical artist, Frederick Lucas Bauer (1760–1826), who collected plants on Norfolk Island in 1804–1805.

Description
The plant is a terrestrial or lithophytic fern. It has a short, erect rhizome, supported by coarse roots, with dark brown, filiform scales. Its tripinnate fronds combine a 5–25 cm tall stipe with a lanceolate lamina 10–30 cm long.

Distribution and habitat
The fern is endemic to Australia's subtropical Lord Howe and Norfolk Islands in the Tasman Sea; it grows in deep shade beside forest streams.

References

Hymenophyllales
Flora of Lord Howe Island
Flora of Norfolk Island
Plants described in 1833
Flora of Australia